St. Matthias Church and variations such as Saint Matthias' Church may refer to various churches, some named specifically for Saint Matthias:

Australia
 St Matthias' Anglican Church, Paddington

Canada
St. Matthias, Bellwoods, an Anglo-Catholic church in Toronto, Ontario

England
St Matthias' Church, Farm Street, Birmingham
St Matthias, Bristol
St Matthias' Church, Burley
St Matthias Church, Richmond, an Anglican church in Richmond, London
St Matthias the Apostle church, Colindale, an Anglican church in Colindale, London
St Matthias Old Church, in Poplar, East End, London
St Matthias' Church, Canning Town, in east London
St. Matthias' Church, Stoke Newington, an Anglican church in Stoke Newington, north London
Church of St Matthias, Malvern Link
St. Matthias' Church, Nottingham

Germany
St. Matthias' Abbey, a Benedictine monastery in Trier, Rhineland-Palatinate

Hungary
Matthias Church, Budapest

India
St. Matthias' Church, Kunnamkulam, in Kerala, a Malankara Orthodox Syrian Church
St. Matthias' Church, Vepery, in Chennai

Nigeria
St. Mattias Anglican Church Anaku, in Anaku Town, Anambra State, South-Eastern Nigeria

Philippines
 San Matias Parish Church, in Santo Tomas, Pampanga
 San Matias Parish, in Tumauini, Isabela

Sri Lanka
St Matthias' Church, Lakshapathiya, Moratuwa

United States
St. Matthias Roman Catholic Church, Ridgewood, Queens, New York
St. Matthias' Episcopal Church (Omaha, Nebraska), NRHP-listed in Douglas County
St. Matthias Episcopal Church (Asheville, North Carolina), NRHP-listed in Buncombe County
St. Matthias Mission, near New Fane, Wisconsin, listed on the National Register of Historic Places
St. Matthias Episcopal Church (Waukesha, Wisconsin), NRHP-listed in Waukesha County

See also
St. Matthias Episcopal Church (disambiguation), including several churches in the United States
St. Matthews' Episcopal Church (disambiguation)
St Matthias School,  Wolverhampton, West Midlands, England	
St. Matthias Anglo Indian Higher Secondary School, in St. Matthias Church Compound, Chennai, India
Saint Matthias (disambiguation)